Sascha Jacobsen (11 December [O.S. 29 November] 1895 - 19 March 1972) was an American violinist and teacher born in Russia, now Finland. He grew up in St. Petersburg, then moved with his family to New York City as a boy.

Biography
He was born on 11 December 1895 in Helsinki, Finland.

He graduated from the Juilliard School in New York in 1915 as a pupil of Franz Kneisel, and on graduation received the Morris Loeb Memorial Award. He founded the Musical Art Quartet, which was active from 1927 to 1933 and made a distinguished early-electric Columbia 78-rpm recording of Haydn's great Quartet in C major, Op. 54, No. 2, which may have been the first complete recording of any Haydn quartet. While in this quartet he played Felix M. Warburg's "Titian" Stradivarius. Later he taught at Juilliard; among his pupils were Julius Hegyi Lynn Blakeslee and Zvi Zeitlin.

In the 1950s Jacobsen served as concertmaster in the Los Angeles Philharmonic under Alfred Wallenstein. He played the Red Diamond Stradivarius violin (see the story about its loss and restoration at ).

He died on 19 March 1972 in Costa Mesa, California.

Legacy
Jacobsen is one of the subjects of George Gershwin's 1922 song "Mischa, Jascha, Toscha, Sascha".
Sascha also gave violin lessons to his dear friend Albert Einstein, and recorded on RCA Victor 78s the Chausson Concerto in D major for Violin, Piano and String Quartet with Jascha Heifetz, Jesus Maria Sanroma, and the Musical Art Quartet of which he was the leader.

External links
 Sascha Jacobsen recordings at the Discography of American Historical Recordings.

References

American male violinists
Jewish violinists
Emigrants from the Russian Empire to the United States
Russian Jews
American people of Russian-Jewish descent
1895 births
1972 deaths
20th-century American violinists
20th-century American male musicians